Thomas Michael Shannon (born July 15, 1939) is an American former professional baseball infielder / outfielder who spent his entire Major League Baseball (MLB) career playing for the St. Louis Cardinals (–). Shannon worked as a Cardinals radio broadcaster from 1972 to 2021.

Shannon was raised in St. Louis, Missouri, and was an integral part of some of the Cards’ most successful seasons, during the 1960s. 

He was the proprietor of Mike Shannon's Steaks and Seafood restaurant in downtown St. Louis until it closed on January 30, 2016. Shannon still operates two Mike Shannon's Grill locations, in Edwardsville, Illinois, and at St. Louis Lambert International Airport, which is run by his grandson, Justin VanMatre.

Early life
Shannon was born and raised in south St. Louis at 7045 Winona Avenue, the second-oldest of six children of Thomas A. Shannon and Elizabeth W. Richason Shannon. Shannon's father was a St. Louis police officer and after getting his law degree, worked in the prosecuting attorney's office before becoming the Prosecuting Attorney for the City of St. Louis in the early 1970s.

Shannon attended grade school at Epiphany of Our Lord Catholic School, and graduated from Christian Brothers College High School in 1957.  He was the Missouri High School Player of the Year in both football and basketball his senior year, and remains the only athlete to win both awards in the same year. 

He attended the University of Missouri before leaving in 1958 to begin his professional baseball career after signing with Bing Devine, general manager of the St. Louis Cardinals. Shannon, who believed himself to be a better football player, has said that if football players were paid better during his era, he probably would have stayed at Missouri and sought a professional football career. His former coach Frank Broyles said that had he stayed in school, Shannon might have won the Heisman Trophy.

Playing career
Shannon began his big league career with the St. Louis Cardinals in 1962. In 1964, he became the team's regular right fielder, shifting to third base (in order to make room for the newly acquired Roger Maris) in 1967. Shannon played in three World Series for the Cardinals. He hit a game-tying two-run homer off Whitey Ford in Game 1 of the 1964 World Series against the New York Yankees, which St. Louis won 9-5.

In 1966, Shannon batted .288 in 137 games with 16 home runs and 64 RBI.  He was named NL Player of the Month in July (.395, 7 HR, 23 RBI).  For 1968, he batted .266 in 156 games, with 15 home runs and 79 RBI; such stats were enough to earn him seventh place in MVP voting, behind teammates Bob Gibson, Curt Flood, and Lou Brock, as well as Giants Willie McCovey and Juan Marichal, and Pete Rose of the Reds.

In Game 3 of the 1967 World Series against the Boston Red Sox, Shannon hit a home run off Gary Bell. In Game 7 of the 1968 World Series against the Detroit Tigers, Shannon's solo home run off Mickey Lolich was the Cardinals' only run off Lolich as the Tigers clinched. Shannon also hit the last home run in the original Busch Stadium (Sportsman's Park) in 1966 and the first one for the Cardinals in the second Busch Stadium (Busch Memorial Stadium). In 1970, he contracted nephritis, a kidney disease, which ended his playing career.

Broadcasting career

Shannon joined the Cardinals' promotional staff in 1971; a year later he moved to the team's radio booth.  For almost three decades Shannon was paired with Hall of Fame announcer Jack Buck on AM 1120 KMOX and the Cardinals Radio Network. After Buck's death in 2002, Shannon became the team's lead radio voice, teaming with Joel Meyers (2002), Wayne Hagin (2003–2005), and John Rooney (2006–2021). In 2006, he moved to KTRS (550) which had won broadcasting rights for the Cardinals and ownership of the station. For the 2011 season, KMOX regained the rights for Cardinals broadcasting and Shannon returned to his former employer.

Shannon received a local Emmy Award for his work on Cardinal broadcasts in 1985, and was inducted into the Missouri Sports Hall of Fame in 1999. He was named Missouri Sportscaster of the Year in 2002 and 2003.

On Friday nights after a Cardinals home game, Shannon traditionally hosted a sports chat show from the Cardinals' home radio booth.

Shannon's signature home run call is "Here's a long one to left/center/right, get up baby, get up, get up...oh yeah!"

During the 1980s, Shannon worked as a backup analyst behind Joe Garagiola and Tony Kubek for NBC's Game of the Week telecasts, typically working with play-by-play man Jay Randolph.

Counting his tenure in the minor leagues, Shannon spent 64 years—nearly his entire adult life—with the Cardinals in some capacity. He also called Cardinals games longer than anyone except Buck.

On August 8, 2014, Shannon was inducted into the St. Louis Cardinals Hall of Fame.

From 2016 until his retirement in 2021, Shannon only called home games for the Cardinals. On January 14, 2021, Shannon announced that the 2021 season, his 50th in the broadcast booth, would be his last. On October 3, 2021, the Cardinals honored Shannon in a farewell ceremony.

References

External links

Mike Shannon at SABR (Baseball BioProject)
Interview with Mike Shannon conducted by Eugene Murdock at the SABR Convention in Saint Louis, Missouri, on July 29, 1978. According to the description at the Cleveland Public Library Digital Gallery, the interview is followed by questions from the audience and also includes remarks by sportscaster Bob Costas and player Flip Holliday: Part 1, Part 2
Biography - Mike Shannon's Restaurant

1939 births
Living people
American people of Irish descent
Major League Baseball broadcasters
Baseball players from St. Louis
Major League Baseball right fielders
Major League Baseball third basemen
Missouri Tigers baseball players
St. Louis Cardinals announcers
St. Louis Cardinals players